In Finnish mythology, Ahti is a heroic character in folk poetry who is sometimes given the epithet Saarelainen ("Islander").

Ahto  is a Finnish sea god.

The connection between the hero Ahti and the god Ahto, if any, is unclear.

Description

Ahti
In the Kalevala the compiler Elias Lönnrot conflated several mythological persons into the main characters in an attempt to create a consistent narrative from several  songs. The heroic figures Kaukomiele and Ahti were condensed into Lemminkäinen in the work. Ahti's story is of a man so eager to fight that he abandons his young wife and sets out on an adventure with his friend Teuri. The original songs in the Ahti cycle have been tentatively dated to the Viking Age because of their references to sea voyages, but Oinas also sees an adventurous element in both Ahti and Kaukamoinen's tales.

Ahti Saarelainen is described as a fierce seagoing warrior. He makes a double vow with his wife Kyllikki, binding him to stay at home and not to engage in raiding, and binding her to stay faithful. However, Kyllikki breaks her oath and Ahti goes on a voyage with his old war companions.  

In the Kalevala, Ahti is mentioned (as a synonym of Lemminkäinen) in Rune IX, where his close association with the sea is made clear; in this verse his marriage to Kyllikki, and their vows, are described. Rune XII describes Kyllikki's breaking of her vow. In Rune XX Ahti is briefly mentioned, and the conflation with Lemminkainen and Kaukomiele is made explicit.

Ahti is also mentioned in Rune XXVI, in Rune XXVIII he is called "Ahti, hero of the Islands", and in Rune XXX he is again identified with Lemminkainen. A pattern of association of the name "Ahti" with islands and seafaring is found in Runes XX, XXVI, XXVII, XXVIII, and other runes.

Ahto
Ahto is the name of the king or god of the sea, and Ahtola is his sea-castle. His wife is Wellamo, and they live together at the bottom of the sea. The Sampo comes into his possession and he is unwilling to return it.

In the Kalevala, Ahto appears in Rune XLI; in Rune XLII, where Väinämöinen charms him with his magic harp playing; in Rune XLIII, where the Sampo is lost in the sea; and in Rune XLVIII, where he is briefly mentioned.

In a fable similar to Mercury and the Woodman, Ahto dives to return the lost knife of a shepherd, out of pity. He first finds a gold knife, and then a silver knife, but the shepherd does not claim them as his. The third knife Ahto retrieves is the correct one; as a reward for his honesty, Ahto gives the shepherd all three.

See also
 Viking Age

References

Sources

Finnish gods
Sea and river gods